Robert Sundholm (born 1941) is an outsider artist. 

A resident of North Bergen, New Jersey, Sundholm became a janitor at the North Bergen town hall and taped his work along the corridor walls. He was discovered in 2009 by an attorney/artist Daniel Belardinelli who curated his first show. His most recent milestones include being curated at the Outsider Art Fair 1/17 as well as being the subject of a video and article for People magazine. Additionally Sundholm donated 21 paintings to the Hanover Charity Benefit hosted by Vanessa Noel.

References 

1941 births
Living people
Outsider artists
20th-century American artists
Artists from New Jersey
Artists from New York City
People from North Bergen, New Jersey